Angels with Dirty Faces is the second studio album by British girl group Sugababes. It was released by Island Records in the UK on 26 August 2002 and in most European territories by September 2002. The album marked the band's debut on the Island label following their split with London Records in 2001 and was their first regular release to be recorded under the second line-up, including new member Heidi Range, who replaced founding member Siobhán Donaghy.

The album features production from Lucas Secon and Xenomania and peaked at number two on the UK Albums Chart, achieving triple platinum status.

Production and release 
Shortly after the release of the final single from the band's debut album, One Touch, group member and co-founder Siobhán Donaghy left the band because of personal differences within the band. She was officially replaced by new member, Heidi Range during 2001. After being dropped by their former label, London Records, the band began to search for a new record label. Having already started writing material for the band's second studio album, they eventually signed with Island Records.

The album was eventually released domestically on 26 August 2002, to much anticipation, following the success of the first two singles to be lifted from the album "Freak like Me" and "Round Round", both of which peaked at number 1 in the UK. The album received favourable reviews from critics, with AllMusic awarding it a 3.5/5 stars.

Almost a month after the album's UK release, it was released across Europe and in New Zealand in September 2002, where it gained considerable success. The album received a Platinum Europe Award by the IFPI in recognition of European sales in excess of one million copies.

Chart performance 
Angels with Dirty Faces performed better than the group's previous album One Touch with the highest position in the UK Albums Chart of number two; it stayed in the charts for forty weeks. "Freak like Me", which samples Gary Numan's "Are 'Friends' Electric?", was the first released single and entered the UK Singles Chart at number one. "Round Round", produced by Xenomania, was the second released single and also debuted on the UK chart at number one. The third single released was a double A-side release of "Stronger" and "Angels with Dirty Faces", which reached number seven on the UK Singles Chart. The last single, "Shape", which samples Sting's single "Shape of My Heart", was the only one from the album not to achieve a position in the top ten of the UK Singles Chart; it entered at number eleven. The song, however, did reach the top ten in Poland (number one), Ireland (number nine) and the Netherlands (number ten).

Track listing 

Notes and sample credits
 denotes additional producer
"Freak like Me" contains an interpolation from "Are Friends Electric?" performed by Tubeway Army and a cover song of the same name by Adina Howard.
"Round Round" contains a sample from "Tango Forte" by German production team Dublex Inc., which itself is based around an unaccredited sample of "Whatever Lola Wants", performed by Les Baxter.
"Shape" samples from "Shape of My Heart" performed by Sting.

Charts

Weekly charts

Year-end charts

Certifications

References 

2002 albums
Albums produced by Bloodshy & Avant
Albums produced by Richard X
Albums produced by Xenomania
Island Records albums
Sugababes albums